Iraqi–Turkish relations are foreign relations between Iraq and Turkey. From late 2011 relations between the two countries have undergone strained turbulence. The two countries share a close historical and cultural heritage.

Turkey has an embassy in Baghdad, and a consulate general in Mosul, Basra and Erbil. While Iraq has an embassy in Ankara and consulate general in Istanbul and Gaziantep. The ambassador of Iraq in Ankara, Turkey, is Mr. Abdul Amir Kamil Abi Tabikh, who has been the representative of Iraq since 5 March 2009. The Iraqi mission in Turkey includes a defense attaché and commerce office in Ankara, and a general consulate in Istanbul. The Ambassador of Turkey in Baghdad, Iraq, is Derya Kanbay, who has been in office since 20 January 2007. The Turkish Embassy in Baghdad also possesses a commerce office.

Political relations in chronological order
Despite the fact that Turkey-Iraq relations have different epochs in history, the two nations are interconnected by various cultural similarities, since Iraqis, along with Syrians, Lebanese, and Egyptians, have traces of Turkish ancestry owing to the chronology with the Ottoman Empire. In order to clarify the relations between Turkey and Iraq, these different stages should be clarified. First of all, these two countries emerged as sovereign countries after the First World War; Iraq became a political unity as a British mandate, and Republic of Turkey became a sovereign country apart from the Ottoman Empire. Although Turkey became an official state in the international arena by the Lausanne Treaty of 1923, the Grand National Assembly in Ankara, founder of modern Turkey, was actually running the government since 1920.

World War I and emergence of two states
Before World War I, contemporary Iraq was part of the Ottoman Empire. Iraq under Ottoman rule did not have political unity. There were three administrative provinces (vilayet) in current Iraq, organised by Land Law of 1858 and Vilayet Law of 1864 of Ottoman Empire: Basra, Baghdad and Mosul provinces. Political unity of these three provinces came to fruition as a result of World War I and the invasion by the UK of this region.

The Ottoman Empire lost World War I and signed the armistice of Moudros with the Allies on 30 October 1918. According to this armistice, the Ottoman Empire's southern border wasn't clarified. The 16th article of the armistice says that Ottoman armies in Iraq, Syria, Yemen, and Hejaz should immediately surrender to Allies. However, Syrian and Iraqi borders were not clarified in this armistice and the Istanbul government did not accept Mosul as a part of Iraq. Moreover, Mosul was occupied by British forces 16 days after the armistice (15 November 1918) which is an illegal action according to international law. This was the beginning of the Mosul problem. 

The borders issue and Mosul Question is the first important issue between Turkey and Iraq. In the last meeting of Ottoman Parliament of Istanbul on 12 January 1920 an act called the National Act was declared. According to that act, the whole of those parts (of the Ottoman Empire), whether within or outside the said armistice lines which are inhabited by an Ottoman Muslim (Turkish and Kurdish) majority, united in religion, in race, and in aim, form a whole which would not be divided for any reason. The future of the territories inhabited by an Arab majority at the time of the signing of the Armistice of Mudros will be determined by a referendum. After the declaration of the National Act, Istanbul parliament was dismissed. However, the new parliament in Ankara which started an independence war, based the independence war upon this act. So, while the Ankara government accepted the self-determination right of Arabs, it was the representative of Kurds and Turks. The Turkish government's claim was that there is no difference between Turks and Kurds, and the Government of Grand National Assembly of Turkey is the Government of Kurds just as much as the government of Turks.

In 1923, a conference was organised in Lausanne, Switzerland, in order to end the Turkish War of Independence (Turkish: Kurtuluş Savaşı; May 19, 1919 – October 29, 1923). The Mosul case was one of the major problems in this conference. One of Britain's major aims was keeping Mosul as a part of British-ruled Iraq instead of Turkey. However, according to Turkish government, the representative of Kurds and Turks, demographically the Kurd and Turk dominated Mosul province should be part of Turkey. The border dispute between Turkey and Iraq could not be solved in this conference, and the discussion of the dispute was postponed. The third article of Lausanne treaty was that the frontier between Turkey and Iraq would be laid down in friendly arrangement to be concluded within nine months. In the event of no agreement being reached between the two governments within the time mentioned, the dispute would be referred to the League of Nations.

After Lausanne, the negotiation process about the Mosul province was started between Turkey and Great Britain. The Halic Conference was organised on 19 May 1924 in order to solve the dispute. However, instead of compromising, the British side asked the Hakkari region to become part of Iraqi. By reaching a dead end, Britain was trying to bring the dispute to the League of Nations, where it could be solved in its favour. So, the League of Nations established an impartial committee to investigate the dispute. In December 1925, the Mosul province was awarded to Iraq, leaving the League of Nations open to the accusation that it was little more than the plaything of the British and French governments. The Sheikh Said rebellion also weakened Turkey in terms of diplomacy. This Kurdish and Islamist rebellion was reflected in the international arena. While Turkey was struggling with a Kurdish rebellion its claims upon representing Kurdish people lost its reliability. Turkey's only small prize in the resolution of League of Nations was getting 10% of the Mosul region's petrol for 25 years. Turkey's calculated money on account should be £29,520,000. However, only £3,500,000 was paid to Turkey until 1955. Turkey claimed that they had unpaid credit of £26,000,000 by their share of Mosul petrol until 1986. In 1986 this credit account was removed from the budget.

By 1923, Turkey had also consolidated its independence, expelling foreign powers from its vastly reduced territory, but maintaining positive relations with Western world for trade and developmental purposes. In Iraq, the League of Nations Mandate of 1920 gave control of the Iraqi province to the British, to the disappointment of Iraqi nationalists. From 1920 until Iraq achieved full independence in 1932, Iraqi relations with its former Turkish rulers were guided by the British and dealt primarily with British trade interests.

1932–1958: the Era of Pacts
During the 1930s, Turkey-Iraq relations were at their most cordial, with both the Hashemite King Ghazi (1912–1939) of Iraq and Kemal Atatürk (1881–1938), the founder of the modern Turkish state and its leader since 1923, continuing to maintain close relations with the British. From the independence of Iraq in 1932 to the republican revolution in 1958, the most significant events in Iraq–Turkey relations were the regional pacts: the Saadabad Pact and the Baghdad Pact. Turkey had two defence-military pacts between Middle Eastern countries in this era, and Iraq was the only Arab country in both of the pacts. In light of this knowledge it can be claimed that during this era Turkey and Iraq had a close, cooperative relationship.

The Saadabad Pact
The Treaty of Saadabad was signed between Iran, Iraq, Afghanistan, and Turkey on 8 July 1937 in the Saadabad Palace of Iran. More than a defence pact, it was a nonaggression and amity pact. There were two major reasons leading the signing of this pact: to solve the border disputes between the members of the pact, and to express the independence of each state in the international arena. The second reason was especially important for Iraq. Except for Turkey, for the rest of the countries this was the first international organization of which they were founders. The 7th article of the pact was the major article between Turkey and Iraq. According to this article, each member of this pact accepts to avert the armed groups within their territory which are a threat to other member states. In other words, it was a way of ensuring that neither Iran nor Iraq would give any sustenance to Kurdish rebels on Turkish territory or vice versa. By the start of World War II, this pact lost its meaning, except for this article. The last summit of the Saadabad Pact was in 1939, and later the pact actually disappeared.

The Baghdad Pact
After World War II, international relations had changed not only in the Middle East but also globally. Iraq became one of the founders of the Arab League in 1945. This league was founded in order to provide a forum for Arab states, and leaving the door open for a possible future federation. First of all, the founding of Israel has radically changed the politics in the Middle East. Iraq took part in the first Arab-Israeli war in 1948 by sending 18.000 troops to defend the Jenin–Nablus–Tulkaram region. This war brought Arab countries together and promoted Arab nationalism and anti-Western ideologies in the region. As a result of pan-Arabism, in the early 1950s, Za'im in Syria examined the possibility of a union between Syria and Iraq. However, first Iraq discouraged Syria's aim, and later it became a remote possibility after the coup d'état in Damascus.

Turkey opted to look in the other direction, being a part of the Western states and, after its accession to the North Atlantic Treaty Organization in 1952, placing itself firmly in the sphere of Western world. For Western countries, Turkey's strategic position was important. Turkey was an unsinkable aircraft carrier. At the same time Turkey could protect itself from the Soviet threat and modernize its army under the tutelage of NATO. These mutual benefits made Turkey a part of NATO. However, Turkey's recognition of Israel in 1948, and later its support of Western interests in the Middle East (e.g. Suez Canal Crisis) negatively affected its relations with the Middle Eastern countries.

The Baghdad Pact emerged in this atmosphere, with Arab countries and Turkey going different directions. Different foci in their extended foreign relations, however, did not preclude Iraq and Turkey from cooperating in common areas of interest. The Baghdad Pact is the evidence of the cooperation between two countries. On 24 February 1954, Iraq and Turkey signed a mutual-defense pact intended to contain the growth of Soviet influence in the region. Later, in 1955, Iran, Pakistan, and Britain had joined the pact. Turkey's, and also Iraq's, aim was to make other Arabic countries members of the pact. However, this aim failed. First of all, Britain's membership to the pact affected Arab countries negatively. Then, Israel was a more important threat to Arab countries than the Soviet Union. Nasserism and Arab socialism were spread among the Arab countries, and more than socialism, imperialism was seen as an enemy.

The Suez Canal Crisis of 1956 affected the pact negatively. Iraq as an Arab member of the pact could not stay neutral in the Suez Crisis. As a result, Iraq excluded Britain from the meetings of the Baghdad Pact and the King of Iraq joined the Arab summit in Beirut in a show of pan-Arab solidarity after the Suez Crisis. Despite the existence of those problems, Iraq was the only Arab member of the Baghdad Pact and tried to create a balance between Turkey, Western countries, and Arab countries.

This experiment ended when Iraq found itself with a new military government and withdrew from the agreement on 14 July 1958, one day before the Baghdad Pact summit in Turkey. At the summit, the situation in Iraq was discussed, and the members of the pact sent a message to the United States to step in on the situation in Iraq. Turkey was more aggressive than the other members of the pact and started to discuss a military intervention. However, the US did not want to take that risk and stopped Turkey. Then, on 31 July 1958, Turkey recognized the new government in Iraq and the tension in Turkey-Iraq relations decreased gradually.

The Baghdad Pact was transformed into CENTO and survived until the Iranian Revolution in 1979.

1958–1990
Iraqi regime and its foreign politics changed after the coup d'état in 1958. As well as Iraq, Turkey had undergone a coup d'état in 1960. The army took control of the government, prepared and constituted a new, more democratic, constitution, then re-established the democratic process again. Turkey's relations with other Middle Eastern countries affected its relations with Iraq during the 40s and 50s. After the coup d'état, Turkish foreign policy shifted into a new era, which is not strictly pro-Western and is extremely dominated by NATO. Turkey considered Middle Eastern countries' concerns in its foreign policy making in this era and had better relations with the Middle Eastern countries. In 1976, the Turkish president Fahri Korutürk visited Baghdad.

Petrol trade
Turkey's new foreign policy strategy during the 60s and 70s showed its benefits during the oil crisis of 1973. OPEC countries declared that Turkey's oil supply would not be limited. Moreover, in August 1973 a petroleum pipeline project between Turkey and Iraq was started, Kirkuk–Yumurtalik, and the project became real on 3 January 1977. The pipeline was supplying 2/3 of Turkey's petrol demand.

Water dispute
The issue of water rights became a contention for the two countries beginning in the 1960s, when Turkey implemented a public-works project (GAP project) aimed at harvesting the water from the Tigris and Euphrates rivers through the construction of  22 dams, for irrigation and hydroelectric energy purposes. Although the water dispute between Turkey and Syria was more problematic, the GAP project was also perceived as a threat by Iraq. The tension between Turkey and Iraq about the issue was increased by the effect of Syria and Turkey's participation in the UN embargo against Iraq, after the Gulf War. However, the issue had never become as significant as the water dispute between Turkey and Syria.

The 2008 drought in Iraq sparked new negotiations between Iraq and Turkey over trans-boundary river flows. Although the drought affected Turkey, Syria, and Iran as well, Iraq complained regularly about reduced water flows. Iraq particularly complained about the Euphrates River because of the large amount of dams on the river. Turkey agreed to increase the flow several times, beyond their means, in order to supply Iraq with extra water. Iraq has seen significant declines in water storage and crop yields because of the drought. To make matters worse, Iraq's water infrastructure has suffered from years of conflict and neglect.

In 2008, Turkey, Iraq, and Syria agreed to restart the Joint Trilateral Committee on water for the three nations to better manage water resources. Turkey, Iraq, and Syria signed a memorandum of understanding on 3 September 2009 in order to strengthen communication within the Tigris-Euphrates Basin and develop joint water flow monitoring stations. On 19 September 2009, Turkey formally agreed to increase the flow of the Euphrates River to 450 to 500 cm until 20 October 2009. In exchange, Iraq agreed to trade petroleum with Turkey and help curb terrorist activity in their border region. One of Turkey's last large GAP dams on the Tigris, the Ilisu Dam is strongly opposed by Iraq and is the source of political strife.

Iran-Iraq War and Turkey
The establishment of military-backed regimes in Turkey and Iraq by 1980 helped strengthen relations on several core issues, as both governments supported secularist and anti-radical policies, stable borders, and closer ties with the West, needed by Iraq for its conflict with Iran and by Turkey in its desire to join the European Union. During the Iran-Iraq war, Turkey stayed neutral officially and preserved political and economical relations with both countries. However, with the whole Western world, indirectly Turkey supported Iraq during the Iran-Iraq war. While Turkey was paying for the petrol with cash, Iraq was buying goods from Turkey by credit loaned from Turkey. That means that Turkey financially supported Iraq during the 1980s.

1990–2003: First Gulf War and after
Following the relatively stabilized era of 1960 to 1990, the Iraqi invasion of Kuwait on 2 August 1990 radically changed Turkey-Iraq relations. After UN SC Resolution 665, Turkey allowed United Nations forces to fly missions from its air bases. The allied coalition achieved its objective and had neither a mandate nor much desire to press on into Iraq itself. A ceasefire agreement was signed at Safwan on 28 February 1991. However, after the cease fire, both Shiites in the south and Kurds in the north of Iraq had risen in revolt. Kurdish forces captured Kirkuk on 19 March 1991 but Republican Guards of Iraq re-captured the city and hundreds of thousands of Kurds escaped to the Iranian and Turkish borders as relatively safe places. Following that incident, UN SC Resolution 688 was passed, which called on Iraq to end its repression of its own population and paved the way for the creation by the coalition powers of a safe haven north of the 36th parallel in Iraq (just south of Erbil). 

During the lack of authority in Iraq, Turkey's relation with Iraq was in a unique situation. The central government in Baghdad had no power in northern Iraq but Turkey's core issue about Iraq was in northern Iraq—Iraqi Kurdistan. So, unwillingly, the Turkish government created political relations with Iraqi Kurds, Talabani, and Barzani. An independent Kurdistan and division of Iraq's integrity was also a threat to the Turkish government. So, while Turkey was establishing political relations with Kurdish political leaders, it also signed a hot pursuit agreement with Saddam Hussein and made several military operations to Iraqi Kurdistan against camps of the Kurdistan Workers' Party (PKK). The 'Border Security and Cooperation Treaty' was signed between Turkey and Iraq in February 1983 and the first military operation was made in the same year by the Turkish Armed Forces. Then these military operations repeated several times during the 1980s, 1990s, and 2000s. Turkey launched 24 military operations to Iraq between 1983 and 2008. In this way, Turkey was practising its physical power in Iraq, threatening and balancing the Iraqi Kurdish political power as well as fighting against the PKK. Turkey found a pragmatic solution for its security problem in this unique situation but this situation was only a short-term period and it changed after the Second Gulf War and the invasion of Iraq.

2003-post invasion
Turkey's relationship with Iraq has shifted to a new era after the invasion of Iraq. In this era, the integrity of Iraq is as important as PKK problem for Turkey-Iraq relations. The status of Kirkuk and Turkoman populations' rights are the subtitles of the disputes. Before the invasion, Turkey was called for the invasion by the U.S., but on 1 March 2003, Turkish parliament rejected being an active member of US-led coalition forces in Iraq. Such a decision of Turkish parliament was seen as both a reaction against the unilateral action of USA in the Middle East and the desire to keep Turkey away from the Iraq war. While Turkey was out of US plans on Iraq, Kurdish leaders of Iraq gained more power by allying with US during the war. Kurdistan Regional Government (KRG), which behaves like a semi-independent unit, eventually emerged, and its aggressive foreign policy disturbed Turkish foreign policy mechanisms. After 2003, political maps of the Greater Kurdistan, covering Turkish lands, were seen on the walls of state buildings of KRG. Furthermore, Massoud Barzani frequently talked about the problems of Kurdish people in Turkey and implied that he could mobilize the Kurdish people against the Turkish government. Lastly, Barzani also objected Turkey's offers regarding a permanent solution of Kirkuk's status problem and ignored Turkey's sensitivity regarding the basic rights of the Iraq Turkmen population. Such attitudes of Barzani simply meant that the KRG prepared to be an independent nation state and Barzani administration was open to use any tool pragmatically to protect its sovereignty.

Also, Turkey's military operations were limited by a result of the invasion. Iraq soils had physically become US soil and Turkey always needed permission of the US to launch a military operation in Iraq. Limited relations with Iraqi Kurdish Leaders, military operations, and very limited relations with central government in the 1990s became useless. So, Turkey had been deadlocked in Iraq and needed a new strategy different from that of the 1990s.

So, after 2008, Turkey came up with a new strategy: communication with all groups in Iraq. For both Sunni and Shiite Arabs, who want to keep Iraq unified, Turkey is an essential actor. Turkey's attitude towards the future of Iraqi Kurdistan and Kirkuk disputes can limit Kurdish leaders. So, in the new era, Turkey had relations with more political groups in Iraq. 

In 2015, Turkish diplomats in Mosul were kidnapped by the Islamic State during the War in Iraq 2013-2017. The diplomats were rescued and the consulate reopened after the Islamic State defeat.

Turkish military presence in Iraq
Based on agreements from 1995 and 1997 relating to Turkey's operations against the PKK, Turkey maintains a military force of some 2,000 troops in bases some 30 – 40 km inside Iraq. Bases are located in different locations along the Turkish border in Dohuk province. After initial deployment to a former Iraqi military airfield at Bamarni, Turkish military control has expanded west of Bamarni to Batifa and to the east close to the town of Kani Masi (Qanimasi) in the Amadiya District. Turkey has also some 150 troops and 20 tanks at Mosul Bashiqa region part of the operations against Islamic state responsible for training Iraqi troops.

On 2017, Turkey signed agreement with Iraq which includes allowing the Turkish army to pursue elements of the PKK in northern Iraq, with the permission of, and in coordination with the Federal Government of Iraq. It also includes opening two liaison offices between Baghdad and Ankara to exchange intelligence and security information between the two countries. The Iraqi cabinet in October 2012 announced that Turkish forces crossing into Iraq "is a violation of Iraq's sovereignty and security" as Turkish forces used military bases in Iraq against the PKK. 

On April 25, 2017, 5 Peshmerga fighters were killed during a Turkish attack on Sinjar in Iraq. Turkey claimed to have destroyed "terror hubs"; Iraq denounced the strike as a “violation" of its "sovereignty”.

On August 23, 2019, Turkish army launched Operation Claw-3 in northern Iraq against PKK.

In May 2021, Iraq protested to Turkish diplomats after the visit of the Turkish Minister of Defense, the Turkish Chief of the General Staff and the Turkish Land Forces Commander to a Turkish base in northern Iraq. The Iraq's Foreign Ministry said that "categorically rejects the continuing violations of Iraqi sovereignty ... by the Turkish military forces.”

In April 2022, Turkey began a military operation in northern Iraq against the  PKK which was called Operation Claw-Lock.
The Iraqi foreign minister condemned the attack, alleging it to be a violation of Iraq's sovereignty.

Current relations
In an earlier sign that Iraq's neighbours were improving their ties with Baghdad, Turkish Prime Minister Recep Tayyip Erdoğan became the first Turkish leader to visit Baghdad in nearly 20 years, in 2008. That visit sought to strengthen ties strained in early 2008 by attacks launched into Turkey by Kurdistan Workers Party (PKK) rebels based in remote parts of northern Iraq.

Tensions have risen between the Kurdistan Regional Government (in northern Iraq) and Turkey, as clashes between Turkey and the PKK continue. Following a 3 April 2009 speech entitled Global Economic Crisis and Turkey, given to the Chatham House Royal Institute of Foreign Affairs on the sidelines of the G20 meeting in London, Turkish Prime Minister Erdoğan said in response to questions on relations with Iraq that "we defend establishment of an Iraqi state on the basis of Iraq nationality. Common ground is being an Iraqi national. If you set up a Kurdish state, then others will try to set up a Shia state and others an Arab state. There, you divide Iraq into three. This can lead Iraq into a civil war." 

In March 2009, the presidents exchanged visits to the other country. Jalal Talabani attended the 5th World Water Forum in Istanbul and suggested a general amnesty for the PKK militants as a solution to the Turkish Kurdish conflict. The next week president Abdullah Gül visited Baghdad, where he met with Jalal Talabani. Gül aimed for a better cooperation in the fight against the PKK. 

On 1 May 2009, Ankara paid host to a surprise visit from Iraqi Mahdi Army leader Muqtada al-Sadr who, in his first public appearance for two years, met with Turkish President Abdullah Gül and Prime Minister Erdoğan for talks which focused on the "political process", and requested Turkey play a greater role in establishing stability in the Middle East. Spokesman Sheikh Salah al-Obeidi confirmed the nature of the talks that had been requested by Al-Sadr and stated that "Turkey is a good, old friend. Trusting that, we had no hesitation in travelling here." After the meeting, al-Sadr visited supporters in Istanbul, where al-Obeidi says they may open a representative office, and attended a meeting with five Iraqi Parliament deputies. US State Department Deputy Assistant Secretary for Near Eastern Affairs Richard Schmierer later indicated Washington's support for Turkish engagement with al-Sadr and its involvement in Iraq in general.

On 8 May, Kurdish Natural Resources Minister Ashti Hawrami announced, "Today I received an email message from the Iraqi Oil Ministry sending us their approval for the Kurdish Government to export oil through the Iraqi pipelines to Ceyhan [in Turkey]." Iraqi Oil Ministry spokesman Asim Jihad initially denied that these first official exports of Kurdish oil had been permitted but later confirmed that, "the Iraqi Oil Ministry will start exporting crude extracted from some oil-fields in Kurdistan." Turkey's Genel Enerji Project Manager Mehmet Okutan, who is leading the joint development of Taq Taq in what is seen as a sign of growing trust in Kurd's ties with Turkey, stated, "We consider the start of the exports as a historic moment for us," with Turkish Democratic Society Party (DTP) Deputy Hasip Kaplan adding, "The good economic and social relations between Turkey and the Iraqi Kurds will serve peace efforts."

Iraq's parliament called on its government to renegotiate partnership agreements with Turkey, Syria, and Iran following a 12 May report from Iraqi Water Committee Chairman Karim al-Yacoubi that water levels had fallen to dangerous levels because neighbouring countries take too much water from the Tigris and Euphrates Rivers and their tributaries. Iraqi deputy Saleh al-Mutlaq attended a 22 May meeting with Turkish Prime Minister Erdoğan and President Gül, while Turkish Foreign Minister Ahmet Davutoğlu met with Iraqi Foreign Minister Hoshyar Zebari at the 23 May meeting of the Organisation of the Islamic Conference (OIC) Council of Foreign Ministers and announced, "We will give as much water as possible to our Iraqi and Syrian friends." According to al-Mutlaq, "They have since increased the quantities of water coming to Iraq by 130 cubic centimetres per second. It is not enough, but it has partly solved the water problems preventing our farmers from planting rice."

Iraqi Prime Minister Nouri Al-Maliki confronted the activities of the PKK, following the May 15 foundation laying ceremony of a Turkish-constructed hospital in Karbala, by claiming that "We have a reliable cooperation with Turkey to bring an end to this terrorist organisation and other organisations that want to damage other neighbouring countries, who are our friends. When it comes to Turkey's possible intervention in northern Iraq, the issue is more massive and complicated than it is assumed to be. There is the need for a grand cooperation", and "I know the mountains where the PKK take shelter; they are precipitous mountains. We will find ways to stop the activities of this terror organisation and to finish this organisation through cooperation and understanding between us and Turkey." Iraqi Kurdish Prime Minister Nechirvan Barzani confirmed, "The Turkish Army threatened an incursion. But with the dialogue built recently, all these problems have been overcome", and "I have always attached a great deal of importance to our relations with Turkey because Turkey is not only a neighbouring country but also very important for us."

On October 19, 2011, twenty-four soldiers were killed and 18 injured during a PPK attack in southeastern Turkey. Rockets were launched at security forces and military sites in the town of Cukurca. Turkey retaliated with air strikes on Kurdish sites in northern Iraq. Several rebels died. The Turkish parliament recently renewed a law that gives Turkish forces the ability to pursue rebels over the border in Iraq."

Iraqi President Barham Salih condemned the 2019 Turkish offensive into north-eastern Syria, stating that "Turkey’s military incursion into Syria is a grave escalation; will cause untold humanitarian suffering, empower terrorist groups. The world must unite to avert a catastrophe, promote political resolution to the rights of all Syrians, including Kurds, to peace, dignity and security".

In December 2020, Iraqi Prime Minister Mustafa Al-Kadhimi visited Turkey, and mentioned that the latter would grant $5 billion to his country in accordance with the Kuwait Conference for Reconstruction of Iraq.

Diplomacy

Republic of Iraq
Ankara (Embassy) 
Istanbul (Consulate–General) 
Gaziantep (Consulate–General)

Republic of Turkey
Baghdad (Embassy) 
Basra (Consulate–General) 
Erbil (Consulate–General) 
Mosul (Consulate–General)

See also
 Foreign relations of Iraq
 Foreign relations of Turkey
 Turks in Iraq
 Iraqis in Turkey

References

 
Turkey
Bilateral relations of Turkey
Relations of colonizer and former colony